ProMedica Toledo Hospital is a 794-bed non-profit hospital in Toledo, Ohio operated by ProMedica. The hospital is a Level I trauma center and the largest acute care hospital in the Toledo metropolitan area with at least 4,800 health care professionals, including more than 1,000 specialty and primary care physicians, making it the region's largest employer.

The hospital's Toledo campus includes ProMedica Russell J. Ebeid Children's Hospital, a Level II pediatric trauma center with 151 beds, including a 72-bed newborn intensive care unit.

Divisions of ProMedica Toledo Hospital include ProMedica Flower Hospital in Sylvania and ProMedica Wildwood Orthopaedic and Spine Hospital in Sylvania Township.

In 2015, the University of Toledo entered into a 50-year agreement with ProMedica to affiliate the school's University of Toledo College of Medicine and Life Sciences with the hospital.

Accreditation

According to HealthGrades, the Toledo Hospital is among the nation's top 5% of hospitals. In 2007, HealthGrades presented TTH with three awards: the Distinguished Hospital Award for Clinical Excellence, the Cardiac Care Excellence Award, and the Cardiac Surgery Excellence Award.

Amenities

The hospital has a cafeteria, two gift shops, internet access, a library, and pastoral services.

There is also a renovation project currently taking place, which will result in the hospital containing a specific heart hospital.

Russell J. Ebeid Children's Hospital
The Toledo campus includes the ProMedica Russell J. Ebeid Children's Hospital, formerly the ProMedica Toledo Children's Hospital. In 2006, 4,856 patients were under the care of Toledo Children's Hospital. The children's hospital treated 26,469 emergencies and performed almost 2000 surgeries the same year.

References

External links 
ProMedica Toledo Hospital
ProMedica Russell J. Ebeid Children's Hospital

Hospitals in Ohio
Hospitals established in 1874
1874 establishments in Ohio
Trauma centers